Stephanian can refer to:

 Stephanian (stage), a stage in the European stratigraphy of the Carboniferous
 Stephanian School of Literature,a body of fictional works written by the alumni of St. Stephen's College, Delhi
 A student at St. Stephen's College, Delhi, a college of the University of Delhi, India

See also
 Stephania (disambiguation)